Miss Nobody is a 2010 American black comedy film directed by Tim Cox and written by Douglas Steinberg. The film stars Leslie Bibb as a mild-mannered secretary who murders her way up the corporate ladder. It also stars Adam Goldberg, Kathy Baker, Brandon Routh, Vivica A. Fox, and Missi Pyle.

Miss Nobody had its world premiere at the 36th Seattle International Film Festival on June 10, 2010. The film also screened at the 26th Boston Film Festival on September 18, 2010, where it won Best Actress for Bibb and Best Ensemble Cast.

Plot
Sarah Jane McKinney  has been working as a secretary at Judge Pharmaceuticals for years, and she's eager to earn better pay and more prestige. As a young girl, her alcoholic father was killed by a statue of Saint George that fell off a church. Ever since, she has looked to St. George as her guardian angel. When a junior executive position opens up at Judge, Sarah's friend Charmaine  encourages Sarah to join her in applying for the job. Sarah's mother Claire  helps her forge her resume, and Sarah ends up winning the job.

On her first full day of work, Sarah arrives at her office to find it being packed up by Milo Beeber. He explains that the Human Resources manager who promoted Sarah got fired, and Milo transferred in from corporate headquarters. Sarah consigns herself to being Milo's secretary. Charmaine coaches Sarah to go along with Milo's inevitable sexual advances as a way to get ahead. After a working dinner, Sarah goes back to Milo's apartment. She is horrified to find out that he is engaged and tries to ward off his advances. Milo chases her up a portable ladder. When Sarah shoves him away, Milo falls backwards and is impaled on an umbrella.

Sarah does not report his death and is promoted to Milo's position. Another executive at Judge, Nan Wilder confronts Sarah about Milo's death. Milo had texted Nan a picture of Sarah at his apartment. Knowing that Nan could report her to the police, Sarah decides to push her in front of an oncoming subway train. She soon receives a faxed picture showing her standing behind Nan on the subway platform. Believing that fax came from Pierre JeJeune, Sarah electrocutes him by activating the office's sprinkler system while Pierre is Xeroxing his butt in a kinky sex game.

Promoted into Pierre's position, Judge sends in a consultant, Morty Wickham, to help Sarah get a handle on her new job. Morty was Pierre's protege, and when he embarrasses Sarah at a corporate event, she decides to kill him. She severs the gas line to Morty's oven, and when he tries to light a bong, his house explodes. The string of deaths at Judge are being investigated by Detective Sergeant Bill Malloy who is also boarding at Sarah and Claire's house. Sarah and Malloy have begun dating, but she worries that he might be closing in on her.

She decides that she needs a fall guy and settles for Joshua Nether. She seduces Joshua and gains access to his personal information, which she uses to set up dummy accounts. Sarah embezzles money from Judge through the dummy accounts, setting everything up to look like Joshua is to blame. Malloy happens to see Sarah and Joshua leaving a restaurant after one of their dates and is heartbroken. When Malloy confronts Sarah about her betrayal, she thinks he is referring to the murders she has committed. She realizes he is referring to Joshua, and they reconcile.

After she poisons Joshua, Sarah is blackmailed by someone who claims that she knows about the embezzled money. Sarah quickly plots out who could be extorting her and various ways to kill them. She even poisons a jug of bottled water belonging to Mr. Ormsby, just in case (marking it with an x). It turns out that Charmaine is blackmailing Sarah. She was jealous of Sarah's promotion, and she was secretly behind most of the events that led Sarah to commit the series of murders. During their confrontation, Charmaine ends up chasing Sarah to the top of a bell tower, where Sarah causes Charmaine to fall to her death.

Thinking her troubles are behind her, Sarah gets engaged to Malloy and decides to try and do good deeds to balance out what she's done. At work, she asks L.J., her assistant, for a glass of water while she writes him a letter of recommendation. As she sips the water, L.J. explains that he had to get the water from Ormsby's office, and Sarah realizes the likelihood that it is the bottle which she'd poisoned. Asking L.J. to check if that bottle had an x marked on its cap, she nervously waits for his reply, while pondering the notion of karma and people getting what they deserve.

Cast
 Leslie Bibb as Sarah Jane McKinney
 Kathy Baker as Claire McKinney
 Barry Bostwick as Father Grisham
 Mia Pollini as Young Sarah Jane
 Mark Irvingsen as Daddy (Earl McKinney)
 Christopher Carley as Frankie Sheftell
 Missi Pyle as Charmaine Abatemarco
 Geoffrey Lewis as Mr. Ketchum
 Brandon Routh as Milo Beeber
 David Monahan as 1st Man
 Larry Sullivan as 2nd Man
 Vivica A. Fox as Nan Wilder
 Sam McMurray as Hale Everwright
 Paula Marshall as Cynthia Bardo
 Richard Riehle as Leonard Ormsby
 Patrick Fischler as Pierre JeJeune
 Eddie Jemison as Joshua Nether
 Salvator Xuereb as Johnny Abatemarco
 Keir O'Donnell as L.J. Feffer
 Adam Goldberg as Bill Malloy
 David Anthony Higgins as Morty Wickham
 Charles Carroll as Mr. Tippet
 Shishir Kurup as Doctor Patuk
 Jazzmun as Snooks
 Hal B. Klein as Reporter
 Amie Barsky as Reporter

Release
The film was released on DVD by Inception Media Group on September 27, 2011.

References

External links
 
 

2010 films
2010 independent films
2010 black comedy films
2010s crime comedy films
American independent films
American black comedy films
American crime comedy films
2010s English-language films
Films about couples
Films about murder
Films shot in Los Angeles
Films about mother–daughter relationships
Workplace comedy films
Films directed by Tim Cox
2010s American films